Ivo Felt (also written as Ivo Feldt; born on 31 October 1968 in Tallinn) is an Estonian film producer and sound engineer.

Since 1987 he worked at Tallinnfilm. 1991-1995 he was a freelancer. In 1995 he was one of the founders of film studio Allfilm.

In 2017 he was awarded with Order of the White Star, V class.

Filmography

 2013 Mandariinid (feature film; producer)
 2018 Take It or Leave It (feature film; producer)
 2019 Truth and Justice (feature film; producer)

References

Living people
1968 births
Estonian film producers
Recipients of the Order of the White Star, 5th Class
People from Tallinn